The following is the timeline of the COVID-19 pandemic in Kerala from 30 January to 1 December 2020. The timeline is accompanied by a list of confirmed COVID-19 deaths in Kerala until 6 August 2020

Timeline of reported COVID-19 cases, recoveries and deaths

List of confirmed deaths

Notes and references

Kerala timeline
Health in Kerala
2020s in Kerala
Disasters in Kerala
Kerala-related lists